Big Run is an unincorporated community on the Right Fork of the Holly River in Webster County, West Virginia, United States.

References

Unincorporated communities in Webster County, West Virginia
Unincorporated communities in West Virginia